A mandoline (US) or mandolin (British, /ˌmandəˈlɪn/, /ˈmandəlɪn/, /ˈmandl̩ɪn/), is a culinary utensil used for slicing and for cutting juliennes; with suitable attachments, it can make crinkle-cuts.

Design 

A mandoline consists of two parallel working surfaces, one of which can be adjusted in height. A food item is slid along the adjustable surface until it reaches a blade mounted on the fixed surface, slicing it and letting it fall.

Other blades perpendicular to the main blade are often mounted so that the slice is cut into strips. The mandoline juliennes in several widths and thicknesses. It also makes slices, waffle cuts and crinkle cuts, and dices firm vegetables and fruits.

With a mandoline, slices are uniform in thickness, which is important with foods that are deep-fried or baked (e.g. potato chips), as well as for presentation. Slices can be very thin, and be made very quickly, with significantly less skill and effort than would be required if cutting with a knife or other blade.

Operation 

A mandoline is used by running a piece of food (with some protection for fingers) along an adjustable inclined plane into one or more blades. On some models vertical blades cut to produce julienne, or a wavy blade is used that produces crinkle cuts. In these models a quarter turn to the food between passes produces dice and waffle cuts.

A mandoline can cause serious injury if not used correctly.

See also 

 Food processor – chops food using motorisation in multiple ways.
 Grater – produces smaller pieces rather than thin sheets.
  – Japanese version, used to shave , dried blocks of skipjack tuna.
 Meat slicer – a tool used to slice meats and other deli products.
 Microplane – used for the grating of various food items.
 Microtome – the laboratory-grade equivalent, for much finer slicing thicknesses.
  – graters used in Japanese cooking.

References

External links 
 Mandoline parts overview

Food preparation utensils